On Fire is the second album by the funk band T-Connection. The album was released in 1978.

Track listing 
All tracks composed by Theophilus Coakley; except where noted.
Side A
 "On Fire" (7:23)
 "Prisoner of My Mind" (4:49)
 "Lady of the Night" (3:41)
 "Watching You" (Monty Brown) - (3:38)

Side B
 "Let Yourself Go" (5:00)
 "Groove to Get Down" (4:18)
 "Cush" (6:28)
 "Playin' Games" (3:55)

Reception

Billboard magazine called On Fire an emotional album with a "lively, joyous quality", while AllMusic felt T-Connection's music was more pop than disco.

Chart performance
In 1978, On Fire peaked at No. 139 on the Billboard Top LPs & Tape chart and No. 40 on the Billboard Soul LPs chart.

References

T-Connection albums
1977 albums
albums produced by Alex Sadkin